The Great Escape is the seventh studio album by the Australian rock music singer-songwriter, Richard Clapton released in February 1982.

Background and release
From 1973 to 1980, Clapton released six studio albums with Infinity /Festival before signing with 
WEA before the release of The Great Escape. The music journalist Ian McFarland called it "one of his strongest albums".

Track listing

Charts

Release history

References 

1982 albums
Richard Clapton albums
albums produced by Mark Opitz
Warner Records albums